The Barbara Dickson Album is a 1980 album released by Scottish singer Barbara Dickson.

The album was released following her return to the top 20 with the single "January February". Produced by prolific songwriter Alan Tarney, the album was a success, reaching No.7 in the UK Charts and remaining in the top 75 for three months. It was certified gold by the BPI for sales of over 100,000 in the UK. Further singles taken from the album were "In the Night" and "It's Really You".

The album was released on Compact disc in 1992.

Track listing 
Side One
 "January February" (Alan Tarney)
 "In the Night" (Barbara Dickson)
 "It's Really You" (Alan Tarney, Trevor Spencer, Tom Snow)
 "Day and Night" (Barbara Dickson, Ian Lynn)
 "Can't Get By Without You" (Alan Tarney)
Side Two
 "Anytime You're Down and Out" (Barbara Dickson)
 "I'll Say it Again" (Alan Tarney)
 "Hello Stranger, Goodbye My Heart" (Barbara Dickson)
 "Plane Song" (Barbara Dickson)
 "Now I Don't Know" (Alan Tarney)

Personnel 

Alan Tarney - bass, guitars, keyboards, vocals
Trevor Spencer - drums, percussion
Mel Collins - saxophone
Recorded at R.G Jones Studios and Riverside Studios, London
Nick Sykes, Nick Glennie-Smith - engineer

References 

1980 albums
Barbara Dickson albums
Epic Records albums
Albums produced by Alan Tarney